The Osage Nation (Osage: 𐓁𐒻 𐓂𐒼𐒰𐓇𐒼𐒰͘, "People of the Middle Waters") is a Midwestern Native American tribe of the Great Plains. The tribe developed in the Ohio and Mississippi river valleys around 700 BC along with other groups of its language family. They migrated west after the 17th century, settling near the confluence of the Missouri and Mississippi rivers, as a result of Iroquois invading the Ohio Valley in a search for new hunting grounds.

The term "Osage" is a French version of the tribe's name, which can be roughly translated as "calm water". The Osage people refer to themselves in their indigenous Dhegihan Siouan language as 𐓏𐒰𐓓𐒰𐓓𐒷, or "Mid-waters".

By the early 19th century, the Osage had become the dominant power in the region, feared by neighboring tribes. The tribe controlled the area between the Missouri and Red rivers, the Ozarks to the east and the foothills of the Wichita Mountains to the south. They depended on nomadic buffalo hunting and agriculture.

The 19th-century painter George Catlin described the Osage as "the tallest race of men in North America, either red or white skins; there being ... many of them six and a half, and others seven feet." The missionary Isaac McCoy described the Osage as an "uncommonly fierce, courageous, warlike nation" and said they were the "finest looking Indians I have ever seen in the West".

In the Ohio Valley, the Osage originally lived among speakers of the same Dhegihan language stock, such as the Kansa, Ponca, Omaha, and Quapaw.  Researchers believe that the tribes likely became differentiated in languages and cultures after leaving the lower Ohio country. The Omaha and Ponca settled in what is now Nebraska; the Kansa in Kansas; and the Quapaw in Arkansas.

In the 19th century, the Osage were forced by the United States to remove from Kansas to Indian Territory (present-day Oklahoma), and the majority of their descendants live in Oklahoma. In the early 20th century, oil was discovered on their land. They had retained communal mineral rights during the allotment process, and many Osage became wealthy through returns from leasing fees generated by their headrights. However, during the 1920s and what was known as the Reign of Terror, they suffered manipulation, fraud, and numerous murders by outsiders eager to take over their wealth. 

In 2011, the nation gained a settlement from the federal government after an 11-year legal struggle over long mismanagement of their oil funds. In the 21st century, the federally recognized Osage Nation has approximately 20,000 enrolled members, 6,780 of whom reside in the tribe's jurisdictional area. Members also live outside the nation's tribal land in Oklahoma and in other states around the country. The tribe is bordered by the Cherokee Nation to the east, the Muscogee Nation and the Pawnee Nation to the south, and the Kaw Nation and Oklahoma proper to the west.

History

Traditional spirituality 
Osage people believed they were an integral part of a broader universe. Their ceremonies and social organization represented what was observed around them that was created by Wakonda. Everything created has the spirit of Wakonda within it, from trees, plants, and the sky to animals and human beings. They believed there were two main divisions to life, consisting of the sky and earth. Life is created in the sky, and descends to the earth in material form. The sky was viewed as masculine in nature and the earth as feminine.

They revered the behavior of animals such as hawks, deer and bears, which were considered to be very courageous. Other species lived long lives, such as pelicans. Because humans lacked many of the characteristics naturally found within other forms of life around them, they were expected to learn from the others and emulate characteristics desirable for survival. Survival was not a competition between humans and non-humans, but rather a struggle between human communities. Efforts for survival were the responsibility of the people and not of Wakonda, although they might ask Wakonda for help. Considering life a struggle among human groups, they viewed warfare as necessary for self-preservation. The people's survival was dependent on their ability to defend themselves. Over time, the Osage developed clan and kinship systems that mirrored the cosmos as they saw it. Osage clans were typically named after elements of their world: animals, plants and weather phenomenon such as storms.

This was a symbolic representation. Each clan had its own responsibilities within the tribe. Names of clans included Red Cedar (Hon-tse-shu-tsy), Travelers in the Mist (Moh-sho-tsa-moie), Deer Lungs (Tah-lah-he) and Elk (O-pon). Children born to a certain clan had a ceremonial naming in order to introduce them to the community. Without a ceremonial name, an Osage child could not participate in ceremonies, so naming was an important part of Osage identity. The people regulated marriage through the clans: clan members had to marry people from opposite clans or divisions. Clan representation was expressed in the arrangement of Osage villages. The sky people lived on the side opposite the earth people, and the lodges of the Osage spiritual leaders were situated in between the two sides.

Osage life was highly ritualized, where there were certain ceremonies would be performed utilizing bundles, ceremonial pipes which used tobacco as offerings to seek Wakonda's aid. These ceremonies were presided over by Osage medicine people and spiritual leaders. Although some of the literature cites these individuals as "priests", this term is misleading and is more Eurocentric in nature. Ceremonies, although very elaborate served basic functions such as requesting aid from Wakonda for continued tribal existence and the blessing of a long life through children.

Ceremonial songs were also a way to document the knowledge spiritual leaders gained, considering there was no written language. Songs of this nature were only taught and shared among other Osages who were sincere and had proven themselves. Many songs and ceremonies were created for all facets of life such as adoption, marriage, war, agriculture and to honor the rising of the sun in the morning.

Pre-colonization 
The Osage are descendants of cultures of indigenous peoples who had been in North America for thousands of years. Studies of their traditions and language show that they were part of a group of Dhegihan-Siouan speaking people who lived in the Ohio River valley area, extending into present-day Kentucky.  According to their own stories (common to other Dhegihan-Siouan tribes, such as the Ponca, Omaha, Kaw and Quapaw), they migrated west as a result of war with the Iroquois and/or to reach more game.

Scholars are divided as to whether they think the Osage and other groups left before the Beaver Wars of the Iroquois.  Some believe that the Osage started migrating west as early as 1200 CE and are descendants of the Mississippian culture in the Ohio and Mississippi valleys. They attribute their style of government to effects of the long years of war with invading Iroquois.  After resettling west of the Mississippi River, the Osage were sometimes allied with the Illiniwek and sometimes competed with them, as that tribe was also driven west of Illinois by warfare with the powerful Iroquois.

Eventually the Osage and other Dhegihan-Siouan peoples reached their historic lands, likely developing and splitting into the above tribes in the course of the migration to the Great Plains. By the 17th century, many of the Osage had settled near the Osage River in the western part of present-day Missouri.  They were recorded in 1690 as having adopted the horse (a valuable resource often acquired through raids on other tribes.) The desire to acquire more horses contributed to their trading with the French.  They attacked and defeated indigenous Caddo tribes to establish dominance in the Plains region by 1750, with control "over half or more of Missouri, Arkansas, Oklahoma, and Kansas," which they maintained for nearly 150 years. Together with the Kiowa, Comanche, and Apache, they dominated western Oklahoma.

The Osage held high rank among the old hunting tribes of the Great Plains. From their traditional homes in the woodlands of present-day Missouri and Arkansas, the Osage would make semi-annual buffalo hunting forays into the Great Plains to the west. They also hunted deer, rabbit, and other wild game in the central and eastern parts of their domain. The women cultivated varieties of corn, squash, and other vegetables near their villages, which they processed for food. They also harvested and processed nuts and wild berries. In their years of transition, the Osage had cultural practices that had elements of the cultures of both Woodland Native Americans and the Great Plains peoples. The villages of the Osage were important hubs in the Great Plains trading network served by Kaw people as intermediaries.

Early French colonization 
In 1673, French explorers Jacques Marquette and Louis Jolliet were among the first Europeans documented to contact the Osage, traveling southward from present-day Canada in their journey along the Mississippi River. Marquette's 1673 map noted the Kanza, Osage, and Pawnee tribes thrived in much of modern-day Kansas.

The Osage called the Europeans  (Heavy Eyebrows) because of their facial hair.  As experienced warriors, the Osage allied with the French, with whom they traded, against the Illiniwek during the early 18th century. The first half of the 1720s was a time of more interaction between the Osage and French colonizers. Étienne de Veniard, Sieur de Bourgmont founded Fort Orleans in their territory; it was the first European colonial fort on the Missouri River. Jesuit missionaries were assigned to French forts and established missions in an attempt to convert the Osage, learning their language to ingratiate themselves. In 1724, the Osage allied with the French rather than the Spanish in their fight for control of the Mississippi region. In 1725, Bourgmont led a delegation of Osage and other tribal chiefs to Paris. They were shown around France, including a visit to Versailles, Château de Marly and Fontainebleau. They hunted with Louis XV in the royal forest and saw an opera.

During the French and Indian War (the North American front of the Seven Years' War), France was defeated by Great Britain and in 1763 ceded control over their lands east of the River Mississippi to the British Crown. The French Crown made a separate deal with Spain, which took nominal control of much of the Illinois Country west of the great river. By the late 18th century, the Osage did extensive business with the French Creole fur trader René Auguste Chouteau, who was based in St. Louis; the city was part of territory under nominal Spanish control after the Seven Years' War but was dominated by French colonists. They were the de facto European power in St. Louis and other settlements along the Mississippi, building their wealth on the fur trade. The Chouteaus named the post Fort Carondelet after the Spanish governor. The Osage were pleased to have a fur trading post nearby, as it gave them access to manufactured goods and increased their prestige among the tribes. Lewis and Clark reported in 1804 that the peoples were the Great Osage on the Osage River, the Little Osage upstream, and the Arkansas band on the Verdigris River, a tributary of the Arkansas River. The Osage then numbered some 5,500. The Osage and Quapaw suffered extensive losses from smallpox in 1801–1802. Historians estimate up to 2,000 Osage died in the epidemic.

In 1804 after the United States made the Louisiana Purchase, the U.S. government appointed the wealthy French fur trader Jean-Pierre Chouteau, a half-brother of René Auguste Chouteau, as the Indian agent assigned to the Osage. In 1809, he founded the Saint Louis Missouri Fur Company with his son Auguste Pierre Chouteau and other prominent men of St. Louis, most of whom were of French-Creole descent, born in North America.  Having lived with the Osage for many years and learned their language, Jean-Pierre Chouteau traded with them and made his home at present-day Salina, Oklahoma, in the western part of their territory.

Wars with other tribes

The Choctaw chief Pushmataha, based in Mississippi, made his early reputation in battles against the Osage tribe in the area of southern Arkansas and their borderlands. In the early 19th century, some Cherokee, such as Sequoyah, voluntarily removed from the southeast to the Arkansas River valley under pressure from European-American settlement in their traditional territory. They clashed there with the Osage, who controlled this area. The Osage regarded the Cherokee as invaders. They began raiding Cherokee towns, stealing horses, carrying off captives (usually women and children), and killing others, trying to drive out the Cherokee with a campaign of violence and fear. The Cherokee were not effective in stopping the Osage raids and worked to gain support from related tribes as well as whites. The peoples confronted each other in the "Battle of Claremore Mound," in which 38 Osage warriors were killed and 104 were taken captive by the Cherokee and their allies. As a result of the battle, the United States constructed Fort Smith in present-day Arkansas. It was intended to prevent armed confrontations between the Osage and other tribes. The U.S. compelled the Osage to cede additional land to the federal government in the treaty referred to as Lovely's Purchase.
In 1833, the Osage clashed with the Kiowa near the Wichita Mountains in modern-day south-central Oklahoma, in an incident known as the Cutthroat Gap massacre. The Osage cut off the heads of their victims and arranged them in rows of brass cooking buckets.  No Osage died in this attack.  Later, Kiowa warriors, allied with the Comanche, raided the Osage and others. In 1836, the Osage prohibited the Kickapoo from entering their Missouri reservation, pushing them back to ceded lands in Illinois.

U.S. interaction
After the Lewis and Clark Expedition was completed in 1806, Jefferson appointed Meriwether Lewis as Indian Agent for the territory of Missouri and the region. There were continuing confrontations between the Osage and other tribes in this area. Lewis anticipated that the U.S. would have to go to war with the Osage, because of their raids on eastern Natives and European-American settlements. However, the U.S. lacked sufficient military strength to coerce Osage bands into ceasing their raids. It decided to supply other tribes with weapons and ammunition, provided they attack the Osage to the point they "cut them off completely or drive them from their country."

For instance, in September 1807, Lewis persuaded the Potawatomie, Sac, and Fox to attack an Osage village; three Osage warriors were killed. The Osage blamed the Americans for the attack. One of the Chouteau traders intervened and persuaded the Osage to conduct a buffalo hunt rather than seek retaliation by attacking Americans.

Lewis tried to control the Osage also by separating the friendly members from the hostile. In a letter dated August 21, 1808, that President Jefferson sent to Lewis, he says that he approves of the measures Lewis has taken in regards to making allies of the friendly Osage from those deemed as hostile. Jefferson writes, "we may go further, & as the principal obstacle to the Indians acting in large bodies is the want of provisions, we might supply that want, & ammunition also if they need it." But the goal foremost pursued by the U.S. was to push the Osage out of areas being settled by European Americans, who began to enter the Louisiana Territory after the U.S. acquired it. 

The lucrative fur trade continued to stimulate the growth of St. Louis and attracted more settlers there. It became a major port on the Mississippi River. The U.S. and Osage signed their first treaty on November 10, 1808, by which the Osage made a major cession of land in present-day Missouri. Under the Osage Treaty, they ceded  to the federal government. 

This treaty created a buffer line between the Osage and new European-American settlers in the Missouri Territory. It also established the requirement that the U.S. president had to approve all future land sales and cessions by the Osage. The Treaty of Ft. Osage states the U.S. would "protect" the Osage tribe "from the insults and injuries of other tribes of Indians, situated near the settlements of white people....". As was common in Native American relations with the federal government, the Osage found that the U.S. did not carry through on this commitment.

Reservations and missionaries
Between the first treaty with the U.S. and 1825, the Osage ceded their traditional lands across what are now Missouri, Arkansas, and Oklahoma in the treaties of 1818 and 1825. In exchange, they were to receive reservation lands to the West and supplies to help them adapt to farming and a more settled culture. 

They were first relocated to a southeast Kansas reservation called the Osage Diminished Reserve. The city of Independence later developed there. The first Osage reservation was a 50 by  strip. The United Foreign Missionary Society sent clergy to them, supported by the Presbyterian, Dutch Reformed, and Associate Reformed churches. They established the Union, Harmony, and Hopefield missions.
Cultural differences often led to conflicts, as the Protestants tried to impose their culture. The Catholic Church also sent missionaries. The Osage were attracted to their sense of mystery and ritual but felt the Catholics did not fully embrace the Osage sense of the spiritual incarnate in nature.

During this period in Kansas, the tribe suffered from the widespread smallpox pandemic of 1837–1838, which caused devastating losses among Native Americans from Canada to New Mexico. All clergy except the Catholics abandoned the Osage during the crisis. Most survivors of the epidemic had received vaccinations against the disease. The Osage believed that the loyalty of Catholic priests, who stayed with them and also died in the epidemic, created a special covenant between the tribe and the Catholic Church, but they did not convert in great number. Catholic clergy accompanied the Osage when they were forced to move again to Indian Territory in what became Oklahoma. 

Honoring this special relationship, as well as Catholic sisters who taught their children in schools on reservations, numerous Osage elders went to the city of St. Louis in 2014 to celebrate its 250th anniversary of founding by the French. They participated in a mass partially conducted in Osage at St. Francis Xavier College Church of St. Louis University on April 2, 2014, as part of planned activities. One of the con-celebrants was Todd Nance, who is the first Osage to be ordained as a Catholic priest.

In 1843, the Osage asked the federal government to send "Black Robes", Jesuit missionaries, to their reservation to educate their children; the Osage considered the Jesuits better able to work with their culture than the Protestant missionaries. The Jesuits also established a girls' school operated by the Sisters of Loretto from Kentucky. During a 35-year period, most of the missionaries were new recruits from Europe: Ireland, Italy, the Netherlands, and Belgium. They taught, established more than 100 mission stations, built churches, and created the longest-running school system in Kansas.

Civil War and Indian wars 
White squatters continued to be a frequent problem for the Osage, but they recovered from population losses, regaining a total of 5,000 members by 1850. The Kansas–Nebraska Act resulted in numerous settlers arriving in Kansas; both abolitionists and pro-slavery groups were represented among those trying to establish residency in order to vote on whether the territory would have slavery. The Osage lands became overrun with European-American settlers. In 1855, the Osage suffered another epidemic of smallpox, because a generation had grown up without getting vaccinated.

Subsequent U.S. treaties and laws through the 1860s further reduced the lands of the Osage in Kansas. During the years of the Civil War, they were buffeted by both sides, as they were located between Union forts in the North, and Confederate forces and allies to the South. While the Osage tried to stay neutral, both sides raided their territory, taking horses and food stores. They struggled simply to survive through famine and the war. During the war, many Caddoan and Creek refugees from Indian Territory came to Osage country in Kansas, which further strained their resources. Although the Osage favored the Union by a five to one ratio, they made a treaty with the Confederacy to try to buy some peace. 

Following the American Civil War and victory of the Union, the Drum Creek Treaty was passed by Congress on July 15, 1870, and ratified by the Osage at a meeting in Montgomery County, Kansas, on September 10, 1870. It provided that the remainder of Osage land in Kansas be sold, and the proceeds used to relocate the tribe to Indian Territory in the Cherokee Outlet. By delaying agreement with removal, the Osage benefited by a change in administration. They sold their lands to the "peace" administration of President Ulysses S. Grant, for which they received more money: $1.25 an acre rather than the 19 cents previously offered to them by the U.S.

In 1867, Lt. Col. George Armstrong Custer chose Osage scouts in his campaign against Chief Black Kettle and his band of Cheyenne and Arapaho Indians in western Indian Territory. He knew the Osage for their scouting expertise, excellent terrain knowledge, and military prowess. Custer and his soldiers took Chief Black Kettle and his peaceful band by surprise in the early morning near the Washita River on November 27, 1868. They killed Chief Black Kettle, and the ambush resulted in additional deaths on both sides. This incident became known as the Battle of Washita River, or the Washita massacre, an ignominious part of the United States' Indian Wars.

Removal to Indian territory

The Osage were one of the few American Indian nations to buy their own reservation. As a result, they retained more rights to the land and sovereignty. They retained mineral rights on their lands.

The Osage established four towns: Pawhuska, Hominy, Fairfax, and Gray Horse. Each was dominated by one of the major bands at the time of removal. The Osage continued their relationship with the Catholic Church, which established schools operated by two orders of nuns, as well as mission churches.

It was many years before the Osage recovered from the hardships suffered during their last years in Kansas and their early years on the reservation in Indian Territory. For nearly five years during the depression of the 1870s, the Osage did not receive their full annuity in cash. Like other Native Americans, they suffered from the government's failure to provide full or satisfactory rations and goods as part of their annuities during this period. Middlemen made profits by shorting supplies to the Indians or giving them poor-quality food. Some people starved. Many adjustments had to be made to their new way of life.

During this time, Indian Office reports showed nearly a 50 percent decline in the Osage population. This resulted from the failure of the U.S. government to provide adequate medical supplies, food and clothing. The people suffered greatly during the winters. While the government failed to supply them, outlaws often smuggled whiskey to the Osage and the Pawnee.

In 1879, an Osage delegation went to Washington, D.C., and gained agreement to have all their annuities paid in cash; they hoped to avoid being continually shortchanged in supplies, or by being given supplies of inferior quality - spoiled food and inappropriate goods. They were the first Native American nation to gain full cash payment of annuities. They gradually began to build up their tribe again but suffered encroachment by white outlaws, vagabonds, and thieves.

The Osage wrote a constitution in 1881, modeling some parts of it after the United States Constitution. By the start of the 20th century, the federal government and progressives were continuing to press for Native American assimilation, believing this was the best policy for them. Congress passed the Curtis Act and Dawes Act, legislation requiring the dismantling of communal lands on other reservations. They allotted communal lands in 160-acre portions to individual households, declaring the remainder as "surplus" and selling it to non-natives. They also dismantled the tribal governments.

20th century to present

Oil discovery
In 1894 large quantities of oil were discovered to lie beneath the vast prairie owned by the tribe. Because of his recent work in developing oil production in Kansas, Henry Foster approached the Bureau of Indian Affairs (BIA) to request exclusive privileges to explore the Osage Reservation for oil and natural gas. Foster died shortly afterward, and his brother, Edwin B. Foster, assumed his interests. 

The BIA granted the request on March 16, 1896, with the stipulation that Foster was to pay the Osage tribe a 10% royalty on all sales of petroleum produced on the reservation. Foster found large quantities of oil, and the Osage benefited greatly monetarily. But this discovery of "black gold" eventually led to more hardships for tribal members.

The Osage had learned about negotiating with the U.S. government. Through the efforts of Principal Chief James Bigheart, in 1907 they reached a deal which enabled them to retain communal mineral rights on the reservation lands. These were later found to have large quantities of crude oil, and tribal members benefited from royalty revenues from oil development and production. The government leased lands on their behalf for oil development; the companies/government sent the Osage members royalties that, by the 1920s, had  dramatically increased their wealth. In 1923 alone, the Osage earned $30 million in royalties. Since the early 20th century, they are the only tribe within the state of Oklahoma to retain a federally recognized reservation.

In 2000 the Osage sued the federal government over its management of the trust assets, alleging that it had failed to pay tribal members appropriate royalties, and had not historically protected the land assets and appreciation. The suit was settled in 2011 for $380 million, and a commitment by the government to make numerous changes to improve the program. In 2016, the Osage nation bought Ted Turner's  Bluestem ranch.

Osage Allotment Act 

In 1889, the U.S. federal government claimed to no longer recognize the legitimacy of a governing Osage National Council, which the people had created in 1881, with a constitution that adopted some aspects of that of the United States.  In 1906, as part of the Osage Allotment Act, the U.S. Congress created the Osage Tribal Council to handle affairs of the tribe. It extinguished the power of tribal governments in order to enable the admission of the Indian Territory as part of the state of Oklahoma in 1907. 

As the Osage owned their land, they were in a stronger position than other tribes. The Osage were unyielding in refusing to give up their lands and held up statehood for Oklahoma before signing an allotment act. They were forced to accept allotment but retained their "surplus" land after allotment to households, and apportioned it to individual members. Each of the 2,228 registered Osage members in 1906 (and one non-Osage) received 657 acres, nearly four times the amount of land (usually 160 acres) that most Native American households were allotted in other places when communal lands were distributed. In addition, the tribe retained communal mineral rights to what was below the surface. As development of resources took place, members of the tribe received royalties according to their headrights, paid according to the amount of land they held.

Although the Osage were encouraged to become settled farmers, their land was the poorest in the Indian Territory for agricultural purposes. They survived by subsistence farming, later enhanced by raising stock. They leased lands to ranchers for grazing and earned income from the resulting fees. In addition to breaking up communal land, the act replaced tribal government with the Osage National Council, to which members were to be elected to conduct the tribe's political, business, and social affairs. Under the act, initially each Osage male had equal voting rights to elect members of the council, and the principal and assistant principal chiefs. The rights to these lands in future generations was divided among legal heirs, as were the mineral headrights to mineral lease royalties. Under the Allotment Act, only allottees and their descendants who held headrights could vote in the elections or run for office (originally restricted to males). The members voted by their headrights, which generated inequalities among the voters.

A 1992 U.S. district court decision ruled that the Osage could vote to reinstate the Osage National Council as city members of the Osage nation, rather than being required to vote by headright. This decision was reversed in 1997 with the United States Court of Appeals ruling that ended the government restoration. In 2004, Congress passed legislation to restore sovereignty to the Osage Nation and enable them to make their own decisions about government and membership qualifications for their people.

In March 2010, the United States Court of Appeals for the Tenth Circuit held that the 1906 Allotment Act had disestablished the Osage reservation established in 1872.  This ruling potentially affected the legal status of three of the seven Osage casinos, including the largest one in Tulsa, as it meant the casino was not on federal trust land. Federal Indian gaming law allows tribes to operate casinos only on trust land. 

The Osage Nation's largest economic enterprise, Osage Casinos, officially opened newly constructed casinos, hotels and convenience stores in Skiatook and Ponca City in December 2013.

Natural resources and headrights
Before having a vote within the tribe on the question of allotment, the Osage demanded that the government purge their tribal rolls of people who were not legally Osage. The Indian agent had been adding names of persons who were not approved by the tribe, and the Osage submitted a list of more than 400 persons to be investigated. Because the government removed few of the fraudulent people, the Osage had to share their land and oil rights with people who did not belong. But, the Osage had negotiated keeping communal control of the mineral rights.  The act stated that all persons listed on tribal rolls prior to January 1, 1906 or born before July 1907 (allottees) would be allocated a share of the reservation's subsurface natural resources, regardless of blood quantum. The headright could be inherited by legal heirs. This communal claim to mineral resources was due to expire in 1926. After that, individual landowners would control the mineral rights to their plots. This provision heightened the pressure for those whites who were eager to gain control of Osage lands before the deadline.

Although the Osage Allotment Act protected the tribe's mineral rights for two decades, any adult "of a sound mind" could sell surface land.  In the time between 1907 and 1923, Osage individuals sold or leased thousands of acres to non-Indians of formerly restricted land.  At the time, many Osage did not understand the value of such contracts and often were taken advantage of by unscrupulous businessmen, con artists, and others trying to grab part of their wealth. Non-Native Americans also tried to cash in on the new Osage wealth by marrying into families with headrights.

Osage Indian murders

Alarmed about the way the Osage were using their wealth, in 1921 the U.S. Congress passed a law requiring any Osage of half or more Indian ancestry to be appointed a guardian until proving "competency". Minors with less than half Osage ancestry were required to have guardians appointed, even if their parents were living. This system was not administered by federal courts; rather, local courts appointed guardians from among white attorneys and businessmen. By law, the guardians provided a $4,000 annual allowance to their charges, but initially the government required little record keeping of how they invested the difference. Royalties to persons holding headrights were much higher: $11,000–12,000 per year during the period 1922–1925. Guardians were permitted to collect $200–1,000 per year, and the attorney involved could collect $200 per year, which was withdrawn from each Osage's income. Some attorneys served as guardians and did so for four Osage at once, allowing them to collect $4,800 per year.

The tribe auctioned off development rights of their mineral assets for millions of dollars.  According to the Commissioner of Indian Affairs, in 1924 the total revenue of the Osage from the mineral leases was $24,670,483. After the tribe auctioned mineral leases and more land was explored, the oil business on the Osage reservation boomed. Tens of thousands of oil workers arrived, more than 30 boom towns sprang up and, nearly overnight, Osage headright holders became the "richest people in the world."  When royalties peaked in 1925, annual headright earnings were $13,000.  A family of four who were all on the allotment roll earned $52,800, comparable to approximately $600,000 in today's economy.

The guardianship program created an incentive for corruption, and many Osage were legally deprived of their land, headrights, and/or royalties.  Others were murdered, in cases the police generally failed to investigate. The coroner's office colluded by falsifying death certificates, for instance claiming suicides when people had been poisoned. The Osage Allotment Act did not entitle the Native Americans to autopsies, so many deaths went unexamined. In the early 1920s there was a rise in murders and suspicious deaths of Osage, called the "Reign of Terror." In one plot, in 1921, Ernest Burkhart, a European American, married Molly Kyle, an Osage woman with headrights. His uncle William "King of Osage Hills" Hale, a powerful business man who led the plot, and brother Bryan hired accomplices to murder Kyle family heirs. They arranged for the murders of Kyle's mother, two sisters, a brother-in-law, and a cousin, in cases involving poisoning, bombing, and shooting.

With local and state officials unsuccessful at solving the murders, in 1925 the Osage requested the help of the Federal Bureau of Investigation. It was the bureau's first murder case. By the time it started investigating, Kyle was already being poisoned. This was discovered and she survived. She had inherited the headrights of the rest of her family.  The FBI achieved the prosecution and conviction of the principals in the Kyle family murders. From 1921 to 1925, however, an estimated 60 Osage were killed, and most murders were not solved.  John Joseph Mathews, an Osage, explored the disruptive social consequences of the oil boom for the Osage Nation in his semi-autobiographical novel Sundown (1934).  Killers of the Flower Moon: The Osage Murders and the Birth of the FBI (2017) by David Grann was a National Book Award finalist; a related major motion picture is in development.

Changes to law and management claims
As a result of the murders and increasing problems with trying to protect Osage oil wealth, in 1925 Congress passed legislation limiting inheritance of headrights only to those heirs of half or more Osage ancestry. In addition, they extended the tribal control of mineral rights for another 20 years; later legislation gave the tribe continuing communal control indefinitely. Today, headrights have been passed down primarily among descendants of the Osage who originally possessed them. But the Bureau of Indian Affairs has estimated that 25% of headrights are owned by non-Osage people, including other American Indians, non-Indians, churches, and community organizations. It continues to pay royalties on mineral revenues on a quarterly basis.

Beginning in 1999, the Osage Nation sued the United States in the Court of Federal Claims (dockets 99-550 and 00-169) for mismanaging its trust funds and its mineral estate. The litigation eventually included claims reaching into the 19th century. In February 2011, the Court of Federal Claims awarded $330.7 million in damages in partial compensation for some of the mismanagement claims, covering the period from 1972 to 2000. On October 14, 2011, the United States settled the outstanding litigation for a total of $380 million. The tribe has about 16,000 members. The settlement includes commitments by the United States to cooperate with the Osage to institute new procedures to protect tribal trust funds and resource management.

Mineral Council

The Osage Tribal Council was created under the Osage Allotment Act of 1906. It consisted of a principal chief, an assistant principal chief, and eight members of the Osage tribal council. The mineral estate consists of more than natural gas and petroleum. Although these two resources have yielded the most profit, the Osage have also earned revenue from leases for the mining of lead, zinc, limestone, and coal deposits. Water may also be considered a profitable asset that is controlled by the Mineral Council.

The first elections for this council were held in 1908 on the first Monday in June. Officers were elected for a term of two years, which made it difficult for them to accomplish long-term goals. If for some reason the principal chief's office becomes vacant, a replacement is elected by the remaining council members. Later in the 20th century, the tribe increased the terms of office of council members to four years. In 1994 by referendum, the tribe voted for a new constitution; among its provisions was the separation of the Mineral Council, or Mineral Estate, from regular tribal government. According to the constitution, only Osage members who are also headright holders can vote for the members of the Mineral Council. It is as if they were shareholders of a corporation.

Modern day

Government
By a new constitution of 1994, the Osage voted that original allottees and their direct descendants, regardless of blood quantum, were citizen members of the Osage Nation. This constitution was overruled through court judgments. The Osage appealed to Congress for support to create their own government and membership rules. In 2004, President George W. Bush signed Public Law 108–431, "An Act to Reaffirm the Inherent Sovereign Rights of the Osage Tribe to Determine Its Membership and Form a Government." From 2004 to 2006, the Osage Government Reform Commission formed and worked to develop a new government. It explored "sharply differing visions arose of the new government's goals, the nation's own history, and what it means to be Osage. The primary debates were focused on biology, culture, natural resources, and sovereignty."

The Reform Commission held weekly meetings to develop a referendum that Osage members could vote upon in order to develop and reshape the Osage Nation government and its policies. On March 11, 2006, the people ratified the constitution in a second referendum vote. Its major provision was to provide "one man, one vote" to each citizen of the nation. Previously, based on the allotment process, persons voted proportionally as shareholders. By a 2/3 majority vote, the Osage Nation adopted the new constitutional form of government. It also ratified the definition of membership in the nation.

Today, the Osage Nation has 13,307 enrolled tribal members, with 6,747 living within the state of Oklahoma. Since 2006 it has defined membership based on a person's lineal descent from a member listed on the Osage rolls at the time of the Osage Allotment Act of 1906. A minimum blood quantum is not required. But, as the Bureau of Indian Affairs restricts federal education scholarships to persons who have 25% or more blood quantum in one tribe, the Osage Nation tries to support higher education for its students who do not meet that requirement.

The tribal government is headquartered in Pawhuska, Oklahoma, and has jurisdiction in Osage County, Oklahoma. The current governing body of the Osage nation contains three separate branches; an executive, a judicial and a legislative. These three branches parallel the United States government in many ways. The tribe operates a monthly newspaper, Osage News. The Osage Nation has an official website and uses a variety of communication media and technology.

Judicial branch
The judicial branch maintains courts to interpret the laws of the Osage Nation. It has the power to adjudicate civil and criminal matters, resolve disputes, and judicial review. The highest court is the Supreme Court. This Supreme Court has a Chief Justice, currently Meredith Drent, who replaced former Chief Justice Charles Lohah. There is also a lower Trial Court and more inferior courts as allowed by the tribal constitution.

Executive Branch
The executive branch is headed by a principal chief, followed by an assistant principal chief. The current principal chief is Geoffrey Standing Bear, and Raymond Red Corn is the assistant principal chief, who were both sworn in on July 2, 2014. Administrative offices also fall under this executive branch.

Legislative Branch
The legislative branch consists of a Congress that works to create and maintain Osage laws. In addition to this role, their mission is to preserve the checks and balances within the Osage government, carry out oversight responsibilities, support trial revenues, and preserve and protect the nation's environment. This Congress is made up of twelve individuals who are elected by the Osage constituency and serve four-year terms. They hold two regular congressional sessions and are headquartered in Pawhuska.

Economic development

The Osage Nation issues its own tribal vehicle tags and operates its own housing authority.  The tribe owns a truck stop, a gas station, and ten smoke shops. 

In the 21st century, it opened its first gaming casino and as of December 2013 has seven casinos. Casinos are located in Tulsa, Sand Springs, Bartlesville, Skiatook, Ponca City, Hominy and Pawhuska. The tribe's annual economic impact in 2010 was estimated to be $222 million. Osage Million Dollar Elm, the casino management company, is encouraging employees in education, paying for certificate classes related to their business, as well as for classes leading to bachelor's and master's business degrees.

Osage Nation Museum

Located in Pawhuska, Oklahoma, the Osage Nation Museum provides interpretations and displays of Osage history, art, and culture. The continuously changing exhibits convey the story of the Osage people throughout history and celebrate Osage culture today. Highlights include an extensive photograph collection, historical artifacts, and traditional and contemporary art. Founded in 1938, the museum is the oldest tribally owned museum in the United States. Historian Louis F. Burns donated much of his extensive personal collection of artifacts and documents to the museum.
 In 2021, a Missouri cave was discovered with ancient Osage art. The contents were sold at auction, but the Osage leadership insists it belongs to the nation.

Representations in literature
 John Joseph Mathews, an Osage writer and historian, explored the adverse social effects of the oil boom for the Osage Nation in his semi-autobiographical novel Sundown (1934); he also wrote histories of the nation, based in part on the oral histories of tribal elders.
 Laura Ingalls Wilder wrote a series of children's books, known as Little House on the Prairie (1932–1943). The novel Little House on the Prairie and its TV adaptation are based on her family's pioneer days in Kansas. They illegally squatted on Osage land and encountered members of the tribe.

Education
In July, 2019, the tribe chartered Bacone College in Muskogee, Oklahoma, as its tribal college.

Notable Osage

Fred Lookout (1865-1949), principal chief
Monte Blue (1887–1963), American actor of the silent and sound eras. 
Louis F. Burns (1920–2012), historian and author, a leading expert on Osage history, customs, and mythology.
Charles Curtis, vice-president of the United States under Herbert Hoover, a descendant of Osage chief Pawhuska.
Cody Deal (b. 1986), television and film actor, best known for his role in the Syfy Original Movie, Almighty Thor
Jerry C. Elliott (b. 1943), one of the first Native Americans in NASA, received the Presidential Medal of Freedom for his actions in saving the lives of the three astronauts aboard Apollo 13.
Guy Erwin (b. 1958), first openly gay bishop in the Evangelical Lutheran Church in America (elected 31 May 2013).
Yatika Starr Fields (b. 1980), painter, muralist and street artist.
David Holt (politician) (b. 1979), Mayor of Oklahoma City; served in the Oklahoma State Senate; he was the first Osage elected to state office since 2006.
Kihegashugah or Little Chief, an Osage leader who traveled to France in the 1820s.
William Least Heat-Moon (b. 1939), professor of English and best-selling author.
John Joseph Mathews (c. 1894–1979), author and historian of the Osage Nation; World War I veteran.
Elise Paschen, poet and daughter of Maria Tallchief.
Wendy Ponca (b. 1960), fashion designer and artist
Carter Revard (b. 1931), poet, author, and Rhodes Scholar, also a specialist in medieval British literature
Lucille Robedeaux (1915–2005), tribal elder and last surviving native speaker of the Osage language
Sacred Sun, a 19th-century Osage woman who was among a group taken to France.
Larry Sellers, healer, actor, linguistic mentor.
Charles Leon Soldani (1893-1968), actor.
Maria Tallchief, classical ballerina with the New York City Ballet; contributed greatly to the success of ballet as a dance art in the United States. 
Marjorie Tallchief, professional ballerina. Both sisters were prima ballerinas who performed in many countries throughout the 20th century.
Clarence L. Tinker (1887–1942), US Army aviation officer who died during World War II while on a Pacific combat mission during the Japanese attack on Midway Island in June 1942. Achieved rank as major general.
Tink Tinker (George Edward Tinker IV) (b. 1944), author and Emeritus Professor of American Indian Studies at Iliff School of Theology, Emeritus Director of Four Winds American Indian Council, Denver
 White Hair, the name of several Osage chiefs in the 18th and 19th century. The indigenous name is anglicized as Pawhuska, also used as the name of a town in Oklahoma.  
Chance Rencountre (born December 31, 1986), mixed martial artists competing in the Welterweight division in the Ultimate Fighting Championship.
Louie McAlpine (b. 1951), author, healer, artist, linguistic teacher, Vietnam veteran
Jeramia Valentine (b. 1983), explorer, civil drafter/designer, airforce aviator, guitarist, pianist, land surveyor, entheogenic bio-chemist, shaman, seer, healer, medicine man.

See also

Osage script
Osage Treaty (disambiguation), several treaties

External links

Osage Nation, official website
Osage Indian Tribe History, from Handbook of North American Indian History, Smithsonian Institution, 1906, at Access Genealogy

Further reading
 
David Grann, Killers of the Flower Moon: The Osage Murders and the Birth of the FBI (2017), Knopf-Doubleday Publishing Group
Willard H. Rollings, Unaffected by the Gospel: Osage Resistance to the Christian Invasion, 1673-1906: A Cultural Victory (2004), Albuquerque: University of New Mexico, 2004
Louie McAlpine, "Osage Medicine: Ancestral Herbs And The Illnesses That They Treat", Grayhorse Indian Village, Scope Publications, 1998.
 Terry P. Wilson,
 The Underground Reservation: Osage Oil, Lincoln: University of Nebraska Press, 1985.
 Indians of North America New York: Chelsea House Publishers, 1988
 Sister Mary Paul Fitzgerald, Beacon on the Plains, Leavenworth, Kansas: Saint Mary College, 1939
 William White Graves, The Annals of Osage Mission, 1934
 Gibson, Arrell M. 1972. Harlow's Oklahoma History , Sixth Edition. Norman, Oklahoma: Harlow Publishing Corporation.

References

 
Plains tribes
American Indian reservations in Oklahoma
Federally recognized tribes in the United States
Native American tribes in Oklahoma
Native American tribes in Missouri
Dhegiha Siouan peoples
Native American tribes in Kansas